Wentworth is a surname which may refer to:

People
 Ali Wentworth, American actress
 Austin Wentworth (born 1990), American football player
 Benning Wentworth (1696–1770), governor of New Hampshire under King George II and King George III
 D'Arcy Wentworth (1762–1827), surgeon in the early days of Sydney, Australia, and father of William Charles Wentworth I
 D'Arcy Wentworth, Jr. (1793–1861), son of D'Arcy Wentworth, army officer and New South Wales politician
 Erastus Wentworth (1813–1886), educator, Methodist Episcopal minister and missionary to China
 Frederick Wentworth, 3rd Earl of Strafford (1732–1799), British peer
 Harold Wentworth (1904-1965), American lexicographer
 Henry Wentworth (c. 1448 – between 1499 and 1501), de jure Lord Despenser and grandfather of Jane Seymour
 Jeff Wentworth (born 1940), member of the Texas State Senate from San Antonio
 John Wentworth (Lieutenant-Governor) (1671–1730), colonial Lieutenant-Governor of New Hampshire
 John Wentworth (judge) (1719–1781), jurist and revolutionary leader in New Hampshire
 John Wentworth (governor) (1737–1820), colonial governor of New Hampshire and Nova Scotia
 John Wentworth (mayor) (1815–1888) Chicago mayor and U.S Congressman
 John Wentworth Jr. (1745–1787), Continental Congress delegate from New Hampshire
 John Wentworth (actor) (1908–1989), British television actor
 Margery Wentworth (c. 1478 – 1550), mother of Jane Seymour
 Marion Craig Wentworth (1872–1942), American playwright, poet, and suffragist 
 Martha Wentworth (1889–1974), American actress 
 Moses J. Wentworth, American politician
 Mungo Wentworth MacCallum (1941–2020), Australian political journalist
 Patricia Wentworth (1878–1961), mystery writer
 Paul Wentworth (1533–1593), English Member of Parliament
 Paul Wentworth (spy) (c. 1736-1793) a lawyer and plantation owner in Surinam
 Sir Peter Wentworth (1529–1596), English Member of Parliament, brother of Paul
 Sir Peter Wentworth (Parliamentarian) (1592–1675), English Parliamentarian, grandson of the above Peter
 Philip Wentworth (1424–1464), English knight and Usher of the King's Chamber
 Stephen G. Wentworth (1811–1897), founder of Wentworth Military Academy
 Thomas Wentworth, 1st Baron Wentworth (1501–1551), Lord Chamberlain of England
 Thomas Wentworth, 2nd Baron Wentworth (1525–1584), son of the 1st Baron Wentworth, blamed for England's loss of Calais to France in 1558
 Thomas Wentworth (Recorder of Oxford) (c. 1568–1628), English Member of Parliament and lawyer
 Thomas Wentworth, 1st Earl of Cleveland (1591–1667), Royalist military leader during the English Civil War
 Thomas Wentworth, 1st Earl of Strafford (1593–1641), English statesman, a major figure in the events leading up to the English Civil War
 Thomas Wentworth, 5th Baron Wentworth (1613–1665), son of the 1st Earl of Cleveland, Member of Parliament and also a Royalist military leader
 Thomas Wentworth, 1st Earl of Strafford (1672–1739), diplomat and First Lord of the Admiralty
 Thomas Wentworth (general), British major-general in charge of land forces during the 1741 Battle of Cartagena de Indias
 Vera Wentworth (1890 – 1957), British suffragist
 William Wentworth (elder), founder of the Wentworth family in America
 William Charles Wentworth I (1790–1872), Australian explorer, journalist and politician
 William Charles Wentworth IV (1907–2003), Australian politician, and noted anti-Communist

Fictional characters
 Frederick Wentworth (Persuasion), a main character in Jane Austen's novel Persuasion
 Richard Wentworth, pulp magazine character as The Spider
 Lovey (Wentworth) Howell, wife of Thurston Howell III of Gilligan's Island

English-language surnames